Paschall may refer to:

People
Bill Paschall (b. 1954), an American Major League Baseball player
Davis Young Paschall (1911-2001), an American administrator of educational institutions

Places
Paschall, Philadelphia, Pennsylvania, a neighborhood in southwest Philadelphia, Pennsylvania, in the United States

See also
Paschal (disambiguation)